The 2016 River City Raiders season was the fourth season for the American indoor football franchise, and their first in American Indoor Football (AIF).

Schedule
Key:

Regular season
All start times are local to home team

Standings

Playoffs
All start times are local to home team

Roster

References

2016 American Indoor Football season
2016 in sports in Missouri
River City Raiders seasons